The 1957/58 NTFL season was the 37th season of the Northern Territory Football League (NTFL).

Wanderers have won their seventh premiership title while defeating the Nightcliff in the grand final by nine points.

Grand Final

References 

Northern Territory Football League seasons
NTFL